The National Wrestling Alliance (NWA) Wrestling Legends Hall of Heroes is a professional wrestling hall of fame that honors people who have competed or played other major roles in the NWA. Organized by wrestling promoter Greg Price, the hall is separate from the NWA Hall of Fame and is not officially endorsed by the company, but the NWA has given permission for the use of its name. An induction ceremony takes place at the annual NWA Legends Fanfest Weekend. In 2007, there were seven inductees in the inaugural class. Seven more honorees were added the following year, and another eight were added to the Hall of Heroes in 2009. The 2009 induction ceremony took place on August 7 and was hosted by Jim Cornette.

Honorees are inducted for work in any area of wrestling, including competing in the ring, managing, refereeing, promoting, and announcing. During the ceremony, personalities from the NWA deliver speeches and present the inductees with plaques. These plaques have the logo of the NWA Legends Fanfest and are identical aside from the year of induction and the inductee's name. Many presenters have been involved in the inductee's career; for example, Gary Hart, who managed Rip Hawk and Swede Hanson, inducted both men, and Buddy Roberts was inducted by Michael Hayes and Jimmy Garvin, both of whom were fellow members of The Fabulous Freebirds. Inductees and other former NWA wrestlers are seated at tables with fans to provide an intimate atmosphere. Although most people honored by the hall attend the dinner and induction ceremony, some are inducted posthumously and others are unable to attend for medical reasons.

Although most wrestlers are inducted individually, tag teams have been inducted together. Ole and Gene Anderson were among the members of the inaugural class; they competed together for many years as storyline brothers. The Fargo brothers (Don, Jackie, and Sonny), who also wrestled in tag team matches together despite not being related in real life, are scheduled to be inducted together in 2009. George Scott, inducted in 2007, and his brother Sandy, inducted in 2008, are the only true relatives in the hall. Rip Hawk and Swede Hanson, who competed as the original Blond Bombers, were also inducted together in 2007.

Like most wrestling halls of fame, there is no physical building that houses the NWA Wrestling Legends Hall of Heroes.

Inductees

References

External links
 Hall of Heroes official website

2007 establishments in the United States
Awards established in 2007
National Wrestling Alliance
Professional wrestling halls of fame
Professional wrestling-related lists